Chornobai settlement hromada is a hromada of Ukraine, in Zolotonosha Raion, Cherkasy Oblast. Its administrative center is the urban-type settlement of Chornobai. It was formed by the government on June 12, 2020. The area of the hromada is 616.2 km2, and it has a population of 

Until 18 July 2020, the hromada belonged to Chornobai Raion. The raion was abolished in July 2020 as part of the administrative reform of Ukraine, which reduced the number of raions of Cherkasy Oblast to four. The area of Chornobai Raion was merged into Zolotonosha Raion.

Structure 

Of the 26 communities in the hromada, one of them is an urban-type settlement:

 Chornobai

22 are villages:

 Bakaieve
 Bohodukhivka
 Velyka Burimka
 Velyki Kanivtsi
 Veselyi Podil
 Veselyi Khutir
 Hryhorivka
 Krasenivka
 Lukashivka
 Mala Burimka
 Mali Kanivtsi
 Marianivka
 Mykhailivka
 Mokhnach
 Nove Zhyttia
 Novoselytsia
 Novoukrainka
 Savkivka
 Staryi Mokhnach
 Tarasivka
 Frankivka
 Khrestyteleve

And 3 are settlements:

 Vyshnivka
 Ivanivka
 Pryvitne

References 

2020 establishments in Ukraine
Hromadas of Zolotonosha Raion